"Georgy Porgy" is a song written by David Paich, included on American rock band Toto's self-titled debut album in 1978. It was released as a single in 1979 and charted on the Billboard Hot 100 (number 48) as well as on both the R&B (number 18) and Dance (number 80) charts.

The lead vocals are performed by guitarist Steve Lukather. Cheryl Lynn provided the female backing vocal, singing an adaptation from the nursery rhyme "Georgie Porgie".

Cash Box said the song begins "with stout drumming and melodic piano playing, conga backing and excellent overlapping flute, guitar and vocal lines."  Billboard called it "an easy flowing, catchy pop disk which contains some jazz and soul elements" and praised the piano and bass playing as well as the vocal line.  Record World said that it "has a light jazzy feeling and clear punchy vocals" as well as powerful instrumentation.

Classic Rock History critic Brian Kachejian rated it as Toto's 7th greatest song, saying that "The song’s incredible swing feel that was so captivating the first time we heard it, still remains an additive pleasure to listen to almost forty years later."

The song is still performed on tour. It is adapted with improvisational solos on guitar and keyboards.

In a 1988 interview with Modern Drummer, Jeff Porcaro discussed developing the groove for "Georgy Porgy":

"...it's imitating Paul Humphrey heavily; it's imitating Earl Palmer very heavily. When it comes to that groove, my biggest influences were Paul Humphrey, Ed Greene, Earl Palmer, and the godfather of that 16th-note groove, James Gadson. That "Georgy Porgy" groove I owe to them."

Personnel

Toto
 Steve Lukather – guitars, lead vocals
 David Paich – piano
 Steve Porcaro – keyboards
 David Hungate – bass
 Jeff Porcaro – drums

Guest musicians
 Lenny Castro – congas
 Jim Horn – saxophone, wind instruments
 Chuck Findley – horns
 Marty Paich – string arrangements
 Sid Sharp – string arrangements
 Cheryl Lynn – backing vocals

Eric Benét version

American R&B singer-songwriter Eric Benét recorded a cover of "Georgy Porgy" for his second studio album, A Day in the Life. This version features vocals from fellow American R&B singer Faith Evans and was produced by R&B group Somethin' for the People. Released on February 8, 1999, Benét's version was successful in New Zealand, where it peaked at number two on the RIANZ Singles Chart, and it became a top-40 hit in France, the Netherlands, Sweden, and the United Kingdom.

Track listings

UK CD1
 "Georgy Porgy" (radio edit) – 4:19
 "Georgy Porgy" (So So Def radio remix with rap) – 3:56
 "Georgy Porgy" (Somethin' for the People remix) – 4:45
 "Georgy Porgy" (So So Def radio remix without rap) – 3:34

UK CD2
 "Georgy Porgy" (album version) – 4:40
 "Georgy Porgy" (Spreadlove's 2 Step vocal mix) – 6:21
 "Georgy Porgy" (Hippie Torales radio remix) – 3:24

UK 12-inch single
A1. "Georgy Porgy" (Hippie Torales remix) – 6:14
B1. "Georgy Porgy" (Spreadlove's 2 Step vocal mix) – 6:21
B2. "Georgy Porgy" (Spreadlove's Demonic dub) – 5:35

European CD single
 "Georgy Porgy" (radio edit) – 4:19
 "Georgy Porgy" (Hippie Torales remix) – 6:14

Australian CD single
 "Georgy Porgy" (radio edit)
 "Georgy Porgy" (Hippie Torales radio remix)
 "Georgy Porgy" (Hani's Fresh Air remix)
 "Georgy Porgy" (Roy Davis Jr. Heavenly Body remix)
 "Georgy Porgy" (Hippie Torrales remix)
 "Georgy Porgy" (Roy Davis Jr. Galactic Sould remix)

Charts

Weekly charts

Year-end charts

Release history

Other covers
 A version by U.S. soul band Charme was released in 1979 featuring an uncredited vocal by Luther Vandross. The single was re-released a few years later after the vocalist's rise in popularity and he was then credited as the featured artist.
 Disco/jazz-funk band Side Effect (with Miki Howard on background vocals) released their version in 1980 from their album After the Rain. It peaked to number 77 on the US R&B Songs chart.
 Montreal born Dwight Druick did a French version in 1979, released on his 1980 album "Tanger".
 In 1991, the song was sampled by rapper MC Lyte for her song "Poor Georgie" on the album Act Like You Know. The song peaked at number 1 on Billboard's Hot Rap Singles on March 6, 1992.
 It was recorded by Filipino rock musician Ramon Jacinto together with Bobby Kimball of Toto from the 2012 album RJ Duets.
 The song was used by Devin the Dude in his song "Georgy" from the album The Dude, and by Guru in "Kissed the World" from the album Jazzmatazz, Vol. 4.
 The song was also covered by Le Flex on the 2021 album ... To Be Continued.
 The song was sampled by Death on the Balcony in their 2015 deep house track 'Addict For Your Love'.

References

Toto (band) songs
1978 songs
1979 singles
Columbia Records singles
Faith Evans songs
Songs based on children's songs
Songs written by David Paich
Warner Records singles